SS Richard A. Van Pelt was a Liberty ship built in the United States during World War II. She was named after Richard A. Van Pelt.

Construction
Richard A. Van Pelt was laid down on 9 January 1945, under a Maritime Commission (MARCOM) contract, MC hull 2401, by J.A. Jones Construction, Brunswick, Georgia; she was sponsored by Mrs. Duncan Morton, and launched on 17 February 1945.

History
She was transferred to Belgium, and renamed Belgium Equity on 28 February 1945. She was operated by the American West African Line, Inc. On 18 December 1946, she was sold to Belgium, for $579,770.03. She was scrapped in 1969.

References

Bibliography

 
 
 
 
 

 

Liberty ships
Ships built in Brunswick, Georgia
1945 ships